
Christianity is the dominant religion in Lesotho, which is estimated to be more than 95 per cent Christian. The 2021 Department of State report found Protestants outnumbered Catholics. Non-Christian religions represent only 1.5% of the population, and those of no religion 3.5%. The non-Christian people primarily subscribe to traditional African religions, with an insignificant (< 0.2%) minor presence of Islam, Judaism and Asian religions.

Christianity
In 2015, Catholics accounted for 49.4 percent of the population while Protestants represented 40 percent (Anglicans 5.3 percent, Pentecostals 15.4 percent, other Protestants 18.2% and other Christians an additional 1.8 percent). The Roman Catholic population is served by the province of the Metropolitan Archbishop of Maseru and his three suffragans (the bishops of Leribe, Mohale's Hoek and Qacha's Nek), who also form the national episcopal conference.

Christianity arrived in Lesotho from French missions at the invitation of King Moshoeshoe I in the 1830s. While King Moshoeshoe I invited Christian missionaries, he retained his traditional religion and divorced two of his wives who had converted to Christianity. Initial reports of French evangelist missionaries alleged cannibalism as a part of Lesotho traditional religion. Later missionaries such as Henry Callaway, as well as anthropologists, consider those initial reports as unreliable and mythical, rather than a historical or true representation of the traditional religion of the Lesotho people.

The first Catholic mission started in 1863. It was called Motse-oa-'M'a-Jesu and led by Bishop Allard. He invited Holy Family Sisters from France to work with Sotho women. The initial efforts aimed at gaining converts as well as ending the practice of polygyny where old men paid a bride price to marry young girls. The later efforts attracted resistance from the traditional families. According to Allard's memoirs, Sotho women converted to Catholicism in larger numbers earlier than Sotho men.

The two Christian denominations have historic links to two major political parties in Lesotho. The Evangelicals have been aligned with the Basotho Congress Party, while the Roman Catholic Church has supported the Basotho National Party. The nuncio accredited to South Africa represents the Holy See to the Lesotho government.

Traditional religion
The traditional Sotho religion is traceable with archaeological evidence to around the 10th century. They share themes with the Tswana traditional religion. The Chief of a Sotho community was also their spiritual leader. Ancestor spirits called Badimo worship practices were a significant part of the Sotho community, along with rituals such as rainmaking dance. The Sotho had developed the concept of Modimo, the Supreme Being. The Modimo, in Sotho theology, created lesser deities with powers to interact with human beings.

Religious rights
The Lesotho constitution protects the freedom of religion, a right that has been broadly and generally respected by the Lesotho Government.

See also
Anglican Diocese of Lesotho
Christian Council of Lesotho
Islam in Lesotho
Roman Catholicism in Lesotho

References